San Benedetto is a Renaissance-style, Roman Catholic church located in Via Sant'Alessandro #51 in Bergamo, region of Lombardy, Italy.

The church was designed in 1500s by Pietro Isabello. The church was refurbished in 1756 - 1757. It acquired at this time a silver altarpiece for the main altar; this was melted down by the Napoleonic authorities during the Cisalpine Republic. 

The two main altarpieces depicting  the Assumption of the Virgin by Giovanni Battista Moroni and San Stefano by Calisto Piazza were transferred to the Pinacoteca Brera in Milan. The monks still remained in the monastery, restoring the convent to life in 1827. In 1841 a new marble altar was completed by Giacomo Bianconi. The walls still retain the Renaissance-style frescoes.

Further reconstructions occurred in the 20th and 21st centuries. The adjacent cloistered convent of the Benedictines, still active, has been recently restored.

16th-century Roman Catholic church buildings in Italy
Renaissance architecture in Lombardy
Churches in Bergamo